The Woodlands Preparatory School was an independent, college-preparatory, nonsectarian, co-educational day school located in The Woodlands, and in unincorporated Harris County, Texas, United States. Founded in 2000, it later became a for-profit IB World School enrolling students from pre-school through grade 12. 

Initially opened as a private school alternative to the Conroe ISD public schools in the midst of a boom of highly skilled oil and gas industry immigration, the school was purchased in 2013 by a Mexican businessman who converted the school to a for-profit model. After several years of steep enrollment declines and high faculty turnover beginning in August of 2014 following the sale, Woodlands Preparatory closed in 2022 and sold its campus to The School of Science and Technology, a chain of non-profit charter schools.

References

External links

 The Woodlands Preparatory School

Private K-12 schools in Harris County, Texas
The Woodlands, Texas
Educational institutions established in 2000
Preparatory schools in Texas
2000 establishments in Texas